Pieńki Królewskie  is a village in the administrative district of Gmina Grudziądz, within Grudziądz County, Kuyavian-Pomeranian Voivodeship, in north-central Poland.

The village has a population of 110.

History
During the German occupation of Poland (World War II), Pieńki Królewskie was one of the sites of executions of Poles, carried out by the Germans in 1939 as part of the Intelligenzaktion.

Transport
The A1 motorway runs nearby, west of the village.

References

Villages in Grudziądz County